"Wake Up Everybody" is an R&B song written by John Whitehead, Gene McFadden and Victor Carstarphen.

Harold Melvin & the Blue Notes version
Originally recorded by Harold Melvin & the Blue Notes, with Teddy Pendergrass singing lead vocals, the song had a somewhat unconventional structure, starting subdued and building slowly to a climax. The title track from their 1975 album, the song spent two weeks at number one on the Hot Soul Singles chart in early 1976. It also enjoyed success on the pop charts, peaking at number 12 on the Billboard Hot 100 chart, number 34 Easy Listening, number 33 in Canada, and number 23 in the UK Singles Chart. They performed the song on Soul Train on November 22, 1975.

Charts

Weekly charts

Year-end charts

Sonia version

"Wake Up Everybody" was covered in 1995 by British singer Sonia. It was produced by Steve Levine for fourth studio album Love Train - The Philly Album (1998). The song was released as the album's first and final single. This single has two B-sides - "Show You the Way to Go" and "Nowhere Left to Hide". The first B-side appears on Sonia's fourth studio album. This was Sonia's last single until "Fool for Love" in 2009.

Track listings
CD and cassette
 "Wake Up Everybody" - 3:38
 "Show You the Way to Go" - 3:53
 "Nowhere Left to Hide" - 3:29

2004 version

In 2004, a cover version was released to coincide with the 2004 presidential election. It features a collection of music stars who urge young people to go out and vote. The song was produced by Babyface, and features various prominent R&B singers and rappers. It was an airplay-only single. Missy Elliott's song "Wake Up" from her album This Is Not a Test! was sampled on this recording. It reached number 19 on the Billboard Bubbling Under R&B/Hip-Hop Songs chart.

Artists
Akon
Ashanti
Babyface
Brandy
Claudette Ortiz
Eve
Fabolous
Faith Evans
Floetry
Jadakiss
Jaheim
Jamie Foxx
Jon B
Keke Palmer
Marques Houston
Mary J. Blige
Miri Ben-Ari
Missy Elliott
Monica
Musiq Soulchild
Nate Dogg
Nick Scotti
Omarion
Rev Run
Wyclef Jean

Other versions

 The song was covered by American singer and actor Nick Scotti. Released as the first single from his self-titled 1993 album, Scotti's version of the song reached #9 on the Billboard Hot Dance Club Play chart in May of that year.
 Rae and Christian featuring Bobby Womack on a 2001 version on their album Sleepwalking.
 Thelma Houston, who had a 1977 #1 with her version of The Blue Notes' "Don't Leave Me This Way", covered "Wake Up Everybody" for her 2007 album A Woman's Touch.
 In 2010, the song was covered by John Legend and The Roots. Also featuring Common, and Melanie Fiona, it was the first single taken from their politically themed album 'Wake Up!'
 A version of the song appears during the opening credits of the 1999 film Life.
 The song was covered by the cast of the musical drama series Star. Their version sampled vocals by Harold Melvin & The Blue Notes & Teddy Pendergrass from the original version.
 Keb' Mo' covered this song on his album "Peace - Back By Popular Demand"
 A version of the song was used in the Wu-Tang Clan song "A Better Tomorrow."
 French hip hop group Alliance Ethnik used the song as a sample for the song "Wake Up" on their 1999 Album "Fat Comeback".

Version by John Legend and The Roots featuring Common and Melanie Fiona

Weekly charts

Year-end charts

References

1975 singles
1976 singles
1995 singles
2004 singles
2010 singles
Akon songs
Ashanti (singer) songs
Brandy Norwood songs
Sonia (singer) songs
Harold Melvin & the Blue Notes songs
All-star recordings
Philadelphia International Records singles
Bertelsmann Music Group singles
Columbia Records singles
Songs written by Gene McFadden
Songs written by John Whitehead (singer)
John Legend songs
The Roots songs
Common (rapper) songs
Melanie Fiona songs
1975 songs